Obaid Raihan (Arabic:عبيد ريحان) (born 14 August 1988) is an Emirati footballer who plays for Al Jazirah Al-Hamra as a goalkeeper.

External links

References

Emirati footballers
1988 births
Living people
Al Shabab Al Arabi Club Dubai players
Hatta Club players
Khor Fakkan Sports Club players
Al Jazirah Al Hamra Club players
UAE First Division League players
UAE Pro League players
Association football goalkeepers